Jacobus Teunis "Koos" van den Berg (18 September 1942 – 21 April 2020) was a Dutch politician of the Reformed Political Party (SGP). Born in The Hague, he served as a member of the House of Representatives from 3 June 1986 to 23 May 2002.

On 21 April 2020, during the COVID-19 pandemic in the Netherlands, Van den Berg died in Nunspeet due to complications from COVID-19, at the age of 77.

References

1942 births
2020 deaths
20th-century Dutch politicians
21st-century Dutch politicians
Members of the House of Representatives (Netherlands)
Reformed Political Party politicians
Politicians from The Hague
Deaths from the COVID-19 pandemic in the Netherlands